Kirby Fighters 2 is a 2020 fighting game for the Nintendo Switch and is the direct sequel to Kirby Fighters Deluxe. Developed by HAL Laboratory and Vanpool and published by Nintendo, the game features characters and assets from the Kirby franchise and uses the Super Kirby Clash game engine. The game released worldwide in September 2020, but was accidentally leaked prior on the Play Nintendo website.

Gameplay 
Kirby Fighters 2 is a platform fighting game for up to four players from the Kirby series through local and online networks. Each player can choose an ability based on copy abilities from prior Kirby games, and each comes with a different moveset. While most characters are different variants of Kirby, additional characters such as King Dedede and Meta Knight are playable as well.

Development and release 
Kirby Fighters 2 was developed by HAL Laboratory and Vanpool, and published by Nintendo, using the Super Kirby Clash game engine. The game released worldwide on September 23, 2020, on the Nintendo eShop, six years after the previous title, Kirby Fighters Deluxe. Shortly after, the game received a free demo. Although the game was released in September, the game was accidentally showcased on the Play Nintendo website as a downloadable title prior to release.

Game developer Tadashi Kawai created a blog post describing the development process of Kirby Fighters 2. He wrote how the "single-player mode evolved from the idea that "this is a multiplayer game, but I want to develop a mode that is fun, even when playing alone."  He also described the game's development during the COVID-19 pandemic in Japan, when all developers were remote workers.

Reception 

The game was met by "mixed or average" reviews, according to the review aggregator Metacritic.

References

External links 

Kirby (series) video games
Nintendo Switch-only games
Nintendo Switch games
2020 video games
Fighting games
Multiplayer and single-player video games
2.5D fighting games
Platform fighters
Video games developed in Japan
HAL Laboratory games
Impact of the COVID-19 pandemic on the video game industry
Video games scored by Hirokazu Ando
Video games scored by Jun Ishikawa
Vanpool games